Felipe de Nóbrega Ribeiro, better known as Bi Ribeiro (March 30, 1961 in Rio de Janeiro) is a bass player.

Since 1977, he is the bass player of the Brazilian rock band Os Paralamas do Sucesso. Ribeiro is responsible for the songwriting of many of Os Paralamas do Sucesso's songs, including "Alagados", "Melô do Marinheiro", "A Novidade" and "Perplexo".

Discography

Guest appearances
Jorge Ben Jor - Benjor (1989)
Legião Urbana - Uma Outra Estação (1997)
Raimundos - Só no Forévis (1999)
Pedro Luís e a Parede - É Tudo um Real (1999)

References

1961 births
Living people
Brazilian bass guitarists
Male bass guitarists
Musicians from Rio de Janeiro (city)
Brazilian rock musicians